Mile Krajina (c. 1923 – 15 October 2014) was a noted gusle player from Croatia, who sang traditional folk songs.

Many of his songs were about his birthplace Oklaj in the Cetina region. He mentions reading the works of famous Croatian poet Andrija Kačić Miošić in primary school as an early influence for his poems and songs. As late as August 2009, he continued to perform for folklore festivals around the country.

He was known for referring to current topics in his songs and for his performances within the scope of political rallies or commemorations.

He died at Osijek, in 2014.

Works
Guslarske Pjesme i pjesnički zapisi. "Zrinski"; Zagreb, 1986
Vukovare, hrvatski viteže. "Zrinski"; Zagreb, 1994. 
Hrvatske pobjede. Zrinski; Zagreb, 1998. 
Hrvatski vitezovi, prijatelji i događaji. Zagreb, 2001.

See also
Music of Croatia

References

Croatian folk musicians
2014 deaths
1920s births